Xinrong District is a district of the city of Datong, Shanxi, People's Republic of China.

References

Weblinks
www.xzqh.org 

County-level divisions of Shanxi
Datong